The 2014 Budapest mayoral election was held on 12 October 2014 to elect the Mayor of Budapest (főpolgármester). On the same day, local elections were held throughout Hungary, including the districts of Budapest. The election was run using a First-past-the-post voting system. In contrast with previous elections where the Mayor served a 4-year term, the winner of this election served for 5 years.

The election was won by incumbent Mayor, and the governing parties' candidate, István Tarlós.

Campaign

Originally, the left-wing opposition, which ran united in the parliamentary elections of April, selected Ferenc Falus, a hospital director nominated by the Together (Együtt) party as its candidate. After bad polling, and campaign mistakes (including an Ice Bucket Challenge video), Falus withdrew on 29 September and endorsed minor party candidate and former Minister of Finance Lajos Bokros.

Results

References

2014 in Hungary
2014 elections in Europe
Local elections in Hungary
History of Budapest